Jonathan Estrada may refer to:

 Jonathan Estrada (footballer, born 1983), Colombian football midfielder
 Jonathan Estrada (footballer, born 1998), Mexican football goalkeeper
 Jonathan Estrada (soccer) (born 2000), American college soccer forward

See also
 John Estrada (born 1973), Filipino film and TV actor
 John L. Estrada (born 1955), U.S. Ambassador to Trinidad and Tobago and 15th Sergeant Major of the U.S. Marine Corps